William Duff Jr. (April 28, 1872 – April 25, 1953) was a merchant, ship owner and political figure in Nova Scotia, Canada. He represented Lunenburg from 1917 to 1925, Queens—Lunenburg from 1925 to 1926 and Antigonish—Guysborough from 1927 to 1936 in the House of Commons of Canada as a Liberal member. Duff represented Lunenburg division in the Senate of Canada from 1936 until his death in 1953.

Early life
He was born in Carbonear, Newfoundland, the son of William Duff, and educated in Carbonear and in Scotland.

Career
He settled at Bridgewater, Nova Scotia, where he married Jennie E. Oxner. He became the publisher of the Bridgewater Enterprise and then the Lunenburg Progress, later amalgamating the two newspapers as the Lunenburg Progress-Enterprise. Duff was also involved in fishing and was president of the Lunenburg Marine Railway Company and the Lunenburg Mutual Marine Insurance Company. He was mayor of Lunenburg from 1916 to 1922. Duff served as deputy speaker in 1926. He was defeated in a bid for reelection in 1926 in Queens—Lunenburg and then was elected in Antigonish—Guysborough in a by-election held later that year following the death of John C. Douglas.

Death
In 1953, Duff died of a heart attack at home in Lunenburg while still a member of the Senate.

Electoral record

External links

 Transcription of obituary from The Bridgewater Bulletin, April 29, 1953

1872 births
1953 deaths
People from Carbonear
Liberal Party of Canada MPs
Members of the House of Commons of Canada from Nova Scotia
Canadian senators from Nova Scotia
Mayors of places in Nova Scotia
Canadian people of Scottish descent